Dance Central is a music rhythm game series developed by Harmonix, creators of the Guitar Hero and Rock Band franchises.

Series

Dance Central (2010)

Dance Central was released exclusively for the Xbox 360 and was a launch title for its Kinect peripheral. The game was officially announced at E3 2010 and later released in October of that year.

Dance Central 2

A direct sequel to the previous game, Dance Central 2 was officially announced at E3 2011 during Microsoft's press conference and was released in October of that year.

Dance Central 3

Dance Central 3 was co-developed by Backbone Entertainment and Harmonix. It was announced at E3 2012 during Microsoft's press conference. The game was released on October 16, 2012 in North & Latin America, & on October 19, 2012 in Europe, Asia, Australia, & Japan.

Dance Central Spotlight

Dance Central Spotlight was announced at E3 2014 for Xbox One, and was released on September 2, 2014. Unlike previous installments, it is distributed digitally via the Xbox Games Store; the initial purchase includes 10 songs, with additional songs available as downloadable content on a near-monthly basis. For Spotlight, Harmonix has emphasized quicker production of DLC, with a goal of having new DLC songs released while they are still in the music charts.

Dance Central (2019)
Dance Central (originally titled Dance Central: Unplugged) was published by Oculus Studios. Announced at PAX East 2019 for the Oculus Rift, and will be a launch title for the Quest and Rift S. It was released on April 30, 2019. Unlike previous instalments, it's a VR title that allows head and hand movement, using the headset and Oculus Touch controllers, and it uses Unreal Engine 4. The tracklist contains 32 songs as well as avatar customization and online multiplayer lounges.

References

External links
 

Video game franchises
Microsoft franchises
Video game franchises introduced in 2010
Oculus Rift games
Meta Quest games